Vyacheslav Aleksandrovich Khrynin (10 August 1937 – 30 October 2021) was a Russian basketball player. Playing for the Soviet team he won a silver medal at the 1964 Summer Olympics, a bronze medal at the 1963 FIBA World Championship, and gold medals at the EuroBasket 1963 and EuroBasket 1965. After retirement he worked as a coach with Dynamo Moscow and a sports functionary with the Soviet basketball federation.

Khrynin died on 30 October 2021, at the age of 84.

References

1937 births
2021 deaths
Russian men's basketball players
Soviet men's basketball players
1963 FIBA World Championship players
Olympic basketball players of the Soviet Union
Basketball players at the 1964 Summer Olympics
Olympic silver medalists for the Soviet Union
Olympic medalists in basketball
Medalists at the 1964 Summer Olympics
Basketball players from Moscow